Live It Up may refer to:

Film and television 
 Live It Up! (film), a 1963 English music-film
 Live It Up! (TV series), a 1978–1990 Canadian lifestyle program

Music

Albums 
 Live It Up (Crosby, Stills & Nash album) or the title song, 1990
 Live It Up (David Johansen album), 1982
 Live It Up! (Holly Woods album) or the title song, 2007
 Live It Up (Isley Brothers album) or the title song (see below), 1974
 Live It Up! (Johnny Mathis album) or the title song, 1962
 Live It Up (Lee DeWyze album) or the title song, 2010

Songs 
 "Live It Up" (360 song), 2014
 "Live It Up" (Bill Haley song), 1953
 "Live It Up" (Isley Brothers song), 1974
 "Live It Up" (Jennifer Lopez song), 2013
 "Live It Up" (Marshall Dyllon song), 2000
 "Live It Up" (Mental As Anything song), 1985
 "Live It Up" (Nicky Jam song), 2018
 "Live It Up" (Tulisa song), 2012
 "Live It Up" (Yüksek Sadakat song), 2011
 "Live It Up", by Airbourne from Black Dog Barking
 "Live It Up", by Blondie from Autoamerican
 "Live It Up", by Colbie Caillat from Gypsy Heart
 "Live It Up", by Dusty Springfield from Dusty
 "Live It Up", by Group 1 Crew from Outta Space Love
 "Live It Up", by Heinz
 "Live It Up", by J. Williams
 "Live It Up", by Jeannie Ortega from the soundtrack of the film Jump In!
 "Live It Up", by Juliana Hatfield from Bed
 "Live It Up", by Lloyd Banks from V.6: The Gift
 "Live It Up", by REO Speedwagon from The Earth, a Small Man, His Dog and a Chicken
 "Live It Up", by Sheryl Crow from Wildflower
 "Live It Up", by Ted Nugent from Cat Scratch Fever
 "Live It Up", by Time Bandits

See also 
 Living It Up (disambiguation)